Sri Wahyuni Agustiani (born 13 August 1994) is an Indonesian weightlifter. Competing in the 48 kg body weight category she won silver medals at the 2013 Asian Championships, 2014 and 2018 Asian Games, and 2016 Summer Olympics.

Biography & Early Career 

Sri Wahyuni Agustiani is a Sundanese woman, born on 13 August 1994 at Bandung, West Java - Indonesia. Since she was 10 years old, she is passionate about weightlifting world, where her dad was her first teacher and inspiration at first.

She started her foray at weightlifting national competition, where she has showed her talent since junior competitions, she's start joining the women's lifting international competition at the age of 15. She won two golds and one silver at the IWF Junior World Weightlifting Championships in Kazan, Russia in June 2014, organised by the International Weightlifting Federation (IWF).

2013 Southeast Asian Games, 2014 Asian Games-2016 Summer Olympics
Before the Olympics, Bandung-born Sri Wahyuni Agustiani had already shown huge potentials after winning silver in the 2014 Asian Games held in Incheon-South Korea and gold in the 2013 Southeast Asian Games.

Sri Wahyuni bring Team Indonesia sealed their first medal at the Rio 2016 Summer Olympics, she won silver medal in the women's 48 kilogram category on Sunday 7 August 2016. Sri lifted 192 kilograms in total to win the silver medal.

2018 Asian Games
In 2018, Indonesian female weightlifter Sri Wahyuni, who competed in the women's 48-kilogram category in the 2018 Asian Games, won also silver medal. This actually the second silver medal, after the last time she get in 2014 Asian Games, Incheon.

References 

1994 births
Living people
Indonesian female weightlifters
Olympic weightlifters of Indonesia
Weightlifters at the 2016 Summer Olympics
Asian Games medalists in weightlifting
Weightlifters at the 2014 Asian Games
Weightlifters at the 2018 Asian Games
Medalists at the 2016 Summer Olympics
Olympic medalists in weightlifting
Olympic silver medalists for Indonesia
Sportspeople from Bandung
Asian Games silver medalists for Indonesia
Medalists at the 2014 Asian Games
Medalists at the 2018 Asian Games
Universiade medalists in weightlifting
Southeast Asian Games gold medalists for Indonesia
Southeast Asian Games medalists in weightlifting
Competitors at the 2013 Southeast Asian Games
Universiade bronze medalists for Indonesia
Medalists at the 2017 Summer Universiade
Islamic Solidarity Games medalists in weightlifting
Islamic Solidarity Games competitors for Indonesia
21st-century Indonesian women